Emancipated is the second studio album by Jamaican dancehall artist Spice. It was released under Spice's own record label, Spice Official Entertainment, and Stealth Music Group, on 26 August 2022.

Track listing

Charts

Release history

References

2022 albums
Spice (musician) albums
Self-released albums